Peter Parrott  (28 June 1920 – 27 August 2003) was a World War II era pilot who flew fighter aircraft during the Battle of France and the Battle of Britain. He later became a test pilot in the RAF, retiring in 1965. Despite being awarded the DFC and AFC, he was famous as being the face of a recruitment campaign to encourage people to join the Royal Air Force. When his medals were sold in 2022, the auction house was quoted as saying "..he did more in 1940, aged just 19, than most people experience in a lifetime."

Early life
Peter Lawrence Parrott was born in Haddenham, Buckinghamshire in June 1920. He finished his education at Lord William's Grammar School in Thame, Oxfordshire. Though many of his family were solicitors, after leaving school he worked for Buckinghamshire County Council.

Career
Parrott joined the RAF on a Short Service Commission in 1938, and was sent to No. 1 Elementary and Reserve Flying Training School at Hatfield, then on to No. 11 Elementary Flying School at RAF Shawbury. After that, he was posted to RAF Catfoss in 1939, towing targets for the armament training school. In January 1940, he was sent to join No. 607 Sqn in France, initially flying Gloster Gladiators, but later converting to Hurricanes in April 1940, with Parrott being the only experienced pilot on the Hurricane in the entire squadron.

The famous picture of Parrott on the recruiting poster, was taken whilst he was stationed in northern France, partaking in the Battle of France. He was giving a display for war correspondents when an RAF photographer asked him to turn around and look at the roof of the Nissen Hut he had just left. "I couldn't see anything of interest there, but as I did so, he dropped to one knee, took a photograph and said 'thank you'." Parrott later stated that when he arrived back in England, the poster was everywhere. After many sorties over northern France against a variety of German aircraft, he received news in early May 1940, that his brother, a Whitley pilot, was listed as missing. Parrott was allowed home on leave on 17 May 1940, and whilst there, he received a telegram telling him to report to No. 145 Sqn at RAF Tangmere. Whilst flying with No. 145 Squadron, Parrott was shot down, crash landing in a field near to the town of Deal in Kent. He was picked up by staff from RAF Manston.

In August 1940, Parrott shot down a Junkers Ju 87 Stuka bomber that had been attacking convoys off the coast of England. The Stuka, of StG 77, crash landed on the Isle of Wight. He also shot down an ME 109 and a JU 88, before being posted to No. 605 Sqn in September 1940. In October 1940, Parrott was posted onto No. 605 Sqn flying from Croydon. It was whilst he was here that he received notification of his DFC on account of him being on operational defence since January 1940. It was noted in his citation in the London Gazette that he was responsible for the shooting down of at least six aircraft.

In April 1941, Parrott was posted to the Central Flying School, then RAF Hullavington and RAF Tern Hill, all on instructional duties. After this, he had a brief spell with No. 57 Operational Training Unit, and then a posting to No. 501 Sqn at Martlesham Heath. Not long after arriving at No. 501 Sqn, Parrott was posted to No. 72 Sqn who were based in Malta.

In 1943, Parrott was posted to No. 43 Sqn, who were operating from Capodichino, near Naples in Italy, and he was promoted to squadron leader a few days after his arrival. He briefly commanded No. 111 Sqn, before returning to No. 43 Sqn, of which Parrott became the commanding officer of in November 1943, retaining command until March 1944.

Parrott was awarded an Air Force Cross in 1952. Post World War II, Parrott was a test pilot for the RAF before retiring from the RAF in 1965 as a wing commander. After leaving the RAF, Parrott held a number of jobs, one of which was flying for the Libyan authorities. In 1973, Colonel Gadaffi instructed Parrott to fly to Uganda and pick-up Idi Amin, who was to be a mediator in the Arab-Israeli War. On arrival at Entebbe Airport, Parrott and his colleagues were detained and interrogated, as the Ugandan authorities thought they were mercenaries.

Personal life
Parrott married Mary Dunning in 1948, who during the war was in the WAAF and had been posted to the Y station at RAF Chicksands. Parrott and Dunning had two children. He died on 27 August 2003. In January 2022, Parrott's medals were sold in an auction alongside those of his brother (Flying Officer Thomas Hayward Parrott, a Whitley pilot), who was killed in 1940. The collection sold for £200,000, and the auction house handling the sale of the medals described as Parrott as someone who "..did more in 1940, aged just 19, than most people experience in a lifetime."

References

Sources

External links
Parrott, Peter Lawrence (Oral history) via the Imperial War Museum

1920 births
2003 deaths
British World War II flying aces
Recipients of the Air Force Cross (United Kingdom)
Recipients of the Distinguished Flying Cross (United Kingdom)
The Few
Royal Air Force pilots of World War II
English aviators
Shot-down aviators
Military personnel from Buckinghamshire